Avestan, or historically Zend, or by the speakers as Upastavakaēna is an umbrella term for two Old Iranian languages: Old Avestan (spoken in the 1st millennium BCE) and Younger Avestan (spoken in the 1st millennium CE). They are known only from their conjoined use as the scriptural language of Zoroastrianism, and the Avesta likewise serves as their namesake. Both are early Eastern Iranian languages within the Indo-Iranian language branch of the Indo-European language family. Its immediate ancestor was the Proto-Iranian language, a sister language to the Proto-Indo-Aryan language, with both having developed from the earlier Proto-Indo-Iranian language; as such, Old Avestan is quite close in both grammar and lexicon to Vedic Sanskrit, the oldest preserved Indo-Aryan language.

The Avestan text corpus was composed in the ancient Iranian satrapies of Arachosia, Aria, Bactria, and Margiana, corresponding to the entirety of present-day Afghanistan as well as parts of Tajikistan, Turkmenistan, and Uzbekistan. The Yaz culture of Bactria–Margiana has been regarded as a likely archaeological reflection of the early "Eastern Iranian" culture that is described in the Zoroastrian Avesta.

Genealogy

Scholars traditionally classify Iranian languages as "old", "middle" and "new" according to their age, and as "eastern" or "western" according to geography, and within this framework Avestan is classified as Eastern Old Iranian. But the east–west distinction is of limited meaning for Avestan, as the linguistic developments that later distinguish Eastern from Western Iranian had not yet occurred. Avestan does not display some typical (South-)Western Iranian innovations already visible in Old Persian, and so in this sense, "eastern" only means "non-western".

Old Avestan is closely related to Old Persian and largely agrees morphologically with Vedic Sanskrit. The old ancestor dialect of Pashto was close to the language of the Gathas.

Forms and stages of development
The Avestan language is attested in roughly two forms, known as "Old Avestan" (or "Gathic Avestan") and "Younger Avestan". Younger Avestan did not evolve from Old Avestan; the two differ not only in time, but are also different dialects.
Every Avestan text, regardless of whether originally composed in Old or Younger Avestan, underwent several transformations. Karl Hoffmann traced the following stages for Avestan as found in the extant texts. In roughly chronological order:
 The natural language of the composers of the Gathas, the Yasna Haptanghaiti, the four sacred prayers (Y. 27 and 54).
 Changes precipitated by slow chanting
 Changes to Old Avestan due to transmission by native speakers of Younger Avestan
 The natural language of the scribes who wrote grammatically correct Younger Avestan texts
 Deliberate changes introduced through "standardization"
 Changes introduced by transfer to regions where Avestan was not spoken
 Adaptions/translations of portions of texts from other regions
 Composition of ungrammatical late Avestan texts
 Phonetic notation of the Avestan texts in the Sasanian archetype
 Post-Sasanian deterioration of the written transmission due to incorrect pronunciation
 Errors and corruptions introduced during copying
Many phonetic features cannot be ascribed with certainty to a particular stage since there may be more than one possibility. Every phonetic form that can be ascribed to the Sasanian archetype on the basis of critical assessment of the manuscript evidence must have gone through the stages mentioned above so that "Old Avestan" and "Young Avestan" really mean no more than "Old Avestan and Young Avestan of the Sasanian period".

Alphabet

The script used for writing Avestan developed during the 3rd or 4th century AD. By then the language had been extinct for many centuries, and remained in use only as a liturgical language of the Avesta canon. As is still the case today, the liturgies were memorized by the priesthood and recited by rote.

The script devised to render Avestan was natively known as Din dabireh "religion writing". It has 53 distinct characters and is written right-to-left. Among the 53 characters are about 30 letters that are – through the addition of various loops and flourishes – variations of the 13 graphemes of the cursive Pahlavi script (i.e. "Book" Pahlavi) that is known from the post-Sassanian texts of Zoroastrian tradition. These symbols, like those of all the Pahlavi scripts, are in turn based on Aramaic script symbols. Avestan also incorporates several letters from other writing systems, most notably the vowels, which are mostly derived from Greek minuscules. A few letters were free inventions, as were also the symbols used for punctuation.

The Avestan script is alphabetic, and the large number of letters suggests that its design was due to the need to render the orally recited texts with high phonetic precision. The correct enunciation of the liturgies was (and still is) considered necessary for the prayers to be effective.

The Zoroastrians of India, who represent one of the largest surviving Zoroastrian communities worldwide, also transcribe Avestan in Brahmi-based scripts. This is a relatively recent development first seen in the ca. 12th century texts of Neryosang Dhaval and other Parsi Sanskritist theologians of that era, which are roughly contemporary with the oldest surviving manuscripts in Avestan script. Today, Avestan is most commonly typeset in the Gujarati script (Gujarati being the traditional language of the Indian Zoroastrians).

Phonology

Avestan has retained voiced sibilants, and has fricative rather than aspirate series. There are various conventions for transliteration of Dīn Dabireh, the one adopted for this article being:

Vowels:
a ā ə ə̄ e ē o ō å ą i ī u ū
Consonants:
k g γ x xʷ č ǰ t d δ θ t̰ p b β f
ŋ ŋʷ ṇ ń n m y w r s z š ṣ̌ ž h

The glides y and w are often transcribed as ii and uu, imitating Dīn Dabireh orthography.

Consonants

Vowels

Grammar

Nouns

Verbs

Sample text

Example phrases
The following phrases were phonetically transcribed from Avestan:

Avestan and Sanskrit 
Avestan is extremely similar to Vedic Sanskrit, as demonstrated by this sample text:

See also
 Proto-Indo-European language
 Proto-Indo-Iranian language
 Vedic Sanskrit

Explanatory notes

Citations

General sources 

 .
 .
 
 .
 .
 .

External links

 Encyclopedia Avestica, an online etymological glossary covering most of the corpus of the language
 Information on Avestan language at avesta.org
 Old Iranian Online (including Old and Young Avestan) by Scott L. Harvey and Jonathan Slocum, free online lessons at the Linguistics Research Center at the University of Texas at Austin
 Old Avestan and Young Avestan at Harvard University
 Text samples and Avesta Corpus at TITUS.
 
 
 glottothèque - Ancient Indo-European Grammars online, an online collection of introductory videos to ancient Indo-European languages produced by the University of Göttingen

 
Ancient languages
Avesta
Eastern Iranian languages
Extinct languages of Asia
Language articles with unknown extinction date
Sacred languages